Selepa celtis, called the hairy caterpillar as a larva, is a moth of the family Nolidae. The species was first described by Frederic Moore in 1858. It is found in Oriental tropics of India, Sri Lanka, Taiwan towards the Ryukyu Islands and Australia.

Description
Its forewings are pinkish-rufous gray. The hindwings are pale gray. Markings are strong in females. Postmedial finely double and antemedial regular. The caterpillar has a rufous-yellow body with a black head.

The caterpillar is a pest of several economically important agricultural crops.

Caterpillars can be controlled by using species Dissolcus parasitoids.

Anacardium
Lannea
Mangifera
Stereospermum
Cassine
Elaeodendron
Emblica officinalis
Combretum
Shorea
Bischofia
Excoecaria agallocha
Mallotus
Phyllanthus
Castanea
Mammea
Cinnamomum
Careya
Acacia nilotica
Albizia
Pithecellobium
Xylia
Strychnos
Loranthus
Lagerstroemia
Woodfordia
Sandoricum
Ficus
Eugenia
Syzygium
Pyrus
Rosa
Adina
Mussaenda
Salix
Nephelium
Schleichera
Manilkara
Solanum
Duabanga
Theobroma
Camellia
Celtis
Trema
Gmelina

References

External links
Seasonal occurrence of insect-pests on aonla (Emblica officinalis Geartn) and their natural enemies

Moths of Asia
Moths described in 1883
Nolidae